Ariana Clarice Richards is an American painter and retired actress. She is best known for her role as Lex Murphy in the blockbuster film Jurassic Park. Richards won several Young Artist Awards for her acting as a child, but as an adult has focused primarily on her art career.

Personal life
Richards's sister, Bethany, is an actress. Her maternal grandmother, who was of Italian ancestry, was a descendant of Renaissance painter Carlo Crivelli. In addition to Italian, her maternal grandfather, William Otto Garrison's father, John, had English ancestry. Richards is a descendant of boxer John L. Sullivan, who had Irish ancestry.

Richards married Mark Aaron Bolton in Oregon in January 2013; Bolton is an Irish immigrant, stunt performer, and a former soldier of the Irish Defence Forces. The couple have a daughter.

Acting
Richards made her acting debut in 1987's Into the Homeland, a made-for-cable release that starred Powers Boothe. She also appeared as Mindy Sterngood in the first Tremors film and reprised her role in the second sequel Tremors 3: Back to Perfection, which went straight-to-video. 

Her most notable appearance was as Lex Murphy in the first Jurassic Park film; she reprised the role briefly in the sequel The Lost World: Jurassic Park. She has been featured in other films such as Angus, where she played a high school cheerleader; she also appeared on television episodes of The Golden Girls, Empty Nest and Boy Meets World.

In addition to acting in movies, Richards appeared in the 1997 music video "Brick" by Ben Folds Five, portraying a high school student having an abortion. She appeared in the September 2006 issue of the British movie magazine Empire discussing a possible return to acting. Richards starred in the 2013 film Battledogs, shot in Buffalo, New York.

In February 2014, Richards was voted No. 98 on VH1's 100 Greatest Child Stars.

Awards
 
 Favourite Newcomer – Japan:  Jurassic Park (1994)-Won
 Favourite Newcomer – Australia:  Jurassic Park  (1994)-Won
 Favourite Newcomer – United Kingdom:  Jurassic Park  (1994)-Won
 Bambi Award:  Jurassic Park  (1993)-Won
 Young Artist Award – Best Young Actress in a Motion Picture: Jurassic Park (1993)-Won
 Young Artist Award – Best Young Actress in a Television Movie: Locked Up: A Mother's Rage (1992)-Won
 Young Artist Award – Best Young Actress in a Television Movie: Switched At Birth (1991)-Won

Filmography

Film

Television

Music videos

Music
On December 17, 1993, Richards released a CD album First Love on the Pony Canyon label in Japan. The album was released only in Japan and is rare and out-of-print. The tracks from the CD can be viewed on the YouTube channel of Philip Jennelle. The album was a mix between teen-pop and dance-friendly ballads of the early 1990s. There was also a single released in very small volume. Ariana and her mother wrote the words to the track "You're The Reason".

15 years later, Richards returned briefly to the world of music in September 2008 and released a cover version of David Foster's "The Prayer" in a duet with Chris M. Allport, whom she has known since a young age.

Art
Richards has become a successful artist. Her paintings, usually of landscapes and figures, tend to be in the style of the impressionists. In October 2005, she won first place in the National Professional Oil Painting Competition (sponsored by American Artist magazine) for the painting Lady of the Dahlias.

As of 2013 Richards lived in Salem, Oregon, and was apprenticing under a professional painter.

Awards
 
Art of the Wests Award of Excellence (2006)
 The National Professional Oil Painting Competition  (2005)

References

External links
 Gallery Ariana—Ariana Richards' art gallery website
 

Living people
20th-century American actresses
21st-century American actresses
21st-century American painters
21st-century American women artists
Actresses from California
Actresses from Salem, Oregon
American child actresses
American child singers
American film actresses
American people of Irish descent
American people of Italian descent
American people of Norwegian descent
American television actresses
American women painters
Art Center College of Design alumni
Artists from Salem, Oregon
Painters from California
People from Healdsburg, California
Pony Canyon artists
Singers from California
Skidmore College alumni
Western Oregon University alumni
21st-century American singers
Year of birth missing (living people)